This is a list of museums in Azerbaijan.

References

See also 
 List of libraries in Azerbaijan
 List of museums by country

Azerbaijan
 
Museums
Museums
Museums
Azerbaijan
Azerbaijan